Charlieu is a commune in the Loire department at the northern end of the Auvergne-Rhône-Alpes region of France. It is home to Charlieu Abbey.

Population

Twin towns
It is twinned with the town of Calne in Wiltshire, UK.

See also
Communes of the Loire department

References

External links
 Town website
Gazetteer Entry

Communes of Loire (department)
Lyonnais